Paul Ross (born 9 November 1960) is  a former Australian rules footballer who played with Footscray in the Victorian Football League (VFL).

Notes

External links 		
		
		
		
		
		
		
Living people		
1960 births		
Place of birth missing (living people)
Australian rules footballers from New South Wales
Western Bulldogs players
North Albury Football Club players